Massively multiplayer online real-time strategy game (MMORTS) mixes the genres of real-time strategy and massively multiplayer online games, possibly in the form of web browser-based games, in which a very large  number of players interact with one another within a virtual world. Players often assume the role of a general, king, or other type of figurehead leading an army into battle while maintaining the resources needed for such warfare.  The titles are often based in a sci-fi or fantasy universe and are distinguished from single or small-scale multiplayer RTSes by the number of players and common use of a persistent world, generally hosted by the game's publisher, which continues to evolve even when the player is offline.

Economics

Many MMORTSs feature living economies. Virtual items and currency have to be gained through play and have definite value for players. Such a virtual economy can be analyzed (using data logged by the game) and has value in economic research; more significantly, these "virtual" economies can affect the economies of the real world.

Such games that feature these economies may also allow commodity trading and simulated stock markets.

See also 

 List of massively multiplayer online games
 List of free massively multiplayer online games
 List of massively multiplayer online real-time strategy games
 Server emulator
 Virtual goods
 Digital currency
 Virtual economy
 Virtual world

References 

Virtual economies
Video game genres
 
Social software
Video game terminology